Charles Morren may refer to
Charles François Antoine Morren (1807–1858) (C. Morren), Belgian botanist, horticulturist and professor at the University of Liège
Charles Jacques Édouard Morren (1833–1886) (E. Morren), Belgian botanist, specialist in Bromeliaceae and son of the above person
Charles Morren, Belgian footballer